Gümüşler is a belde (town) in Niğde Province, Turkey. During the Byzantine era, its name was Tracias. The most important Byzantine building in the town is Gümüşler Monastery, which is a cave monastery. The population of Gümüşler is 2325 as of 2011.

See also
 Gümüşler Monastery
 Gümüşler Dam

References

Populated places in Niğde Province
Towns in Turkey
Niğde Central District